Hieracium karelorum is a species of flowering plant belonging to the family Asteraceae.

Its native range is Finland to European Russia.

References

karelorum
Flora of Finland
Flora of North European Russia
Flora of Northwest European Russia
Flora of Central European Russia
Plants described in 1906